Romário Santos Pires (born 16 January 1989) is a Brazilian professional footballer who plays as a midfielder for Liga I club Universitatea Cluj.

After starting out with several teams in his native Brazil, he went on to compete professionally in Romania and Israel.

Personal life
Pires is named after the former Brazilian international Romário, of which his father was a fan. He married a Romanian handballer in 2020, with the couple having one daughter.

Career statistics

Honours
Petrolul Ploiești
Cupa României: 2012–13
Supercupa României runner-up: 2013

Maccabi Haifa
Israel State Cup: 2015–16

Astra Giurgiu
Cupa României runner-up: 2018–19

References

External links

1989 births
Living people
Footballers from Rio de Janeiro (city)
Brazilian footballers
Association football midfielders
Campeonato Brasileiro Série B players
Campeonato Brasileiro Série C players
Botafogo de Futebol e Regatas players
Olaria Atlético Clube players
Botafogo Futebol Clube (PB) players
Duque de Caxias Futebol Clube players
Macaé Esporte Futebol Clube players
Boavista Sport Club players
Liga I players
Israeli Premier League players
ACF Gloria Bistrița players
FC Petrolul Ploiești players
Maccabi Netanya F.C. players
Maccabi Haifa F.C. players
Maccabi Petah Tikva F.C. players
FC Astra Giurgiu players
FC Hermannstadt players
FCV Farul Constanța players
Liga II players
FC Universitatea Cluj players
Expatriate footballers in Romania
Expatriate footballers in Israel
Brazilian expatriate footballers
Brazilian expatriate sportspeople in Romania
Brazilian expatriate sportspeople in Israel